The narrow-nosed rhinoceros (Stephanorhinus hemitoechus) is an extinct species of rhinoceros that lived in western Eurasia and North Africa during the Pleistocene. It first appeared in Europe some 600,000 years ago, and survived there until as recently as 40,000 years Before Present

Description 

It can be distinguished from other species of Stephanorhinus by its very long and low skull. Its nasals are relatively low, and its horn base poorly developed. Teeth are forward shifting.

The narrow-nosed rhinoceros probably favored temperate open areas rich in low-growing vegetation. It displayed many similarities to its better known extinct relative, the woolly rhinoceros. However, it was probably not a true grazer, but a mixed feeder, eating low-growing vegetation in open habitats.

In Apulia in southern Italy, remains of narrow-nosed rhinoceros from the middle Late Pleistocene were found to be smaller than those of other areas, indicating they may have been an insular form.

Age and distribution
From the late Middle Pleistocene onwards, the narrow-nosed rhinoceros and its relative, the Merck's rhinoceros were the only surviving species of Stephanorhinus. In comparison to the widespread Merck's rhinoceros, the narrow-nosed rhinoceros was generally confined to the western Palearctic.

In North Africa, the youngest remains of the narrow-nosed rhinoceros date to between 109 and 53 kya.

The narrow-nosed rhinoceros survived until around 40 kya in southern Europe. The last records in Italy date to around 41,000 years ago., while remains dating to 40,000 years ago are knowns from Bacho Kiro cave in Bulgaria.

Human exploitation 
Specimens of S. hemitoechus from the Middle Pleistocene (MIS 12, 478,000-424,000 years ago) Caune de l'Arago site in Southern France shows extensive evidence of butchery by hominins. The ratios of skeletal elements implies that only the parts of the body with the most meat were carried to the site. The profile of ages of rhino bones in the cave resembles natural mortality curves, suggesting that there was not selective hunting, and the fact that marks of other carnivores are rare implies that the carcasses were acquired by active scavenging or opportunistic hunting.

References

Pleistocene rhinoceroses
Prehistoric mammals of Europe
Pleistocene mammals of Europe
Prehistoric mammals of Asia
Pleistocene mammals of Asia
Prehistoric mammals of Africa
Pleistocene mammals of Africa
Pleistocene extinctions